Castillo de Gorioj o Tucumachay (Quechua  Tucumachay cougar, Cueva de Buho, -q a suffix, Ancash Quechua hirka mountain, "Cueva de Buho" (Tucumachay, or Tucumachay in good Quechua), hispanicized spelling Tucumachay) is an archaeological site in Peru.

See also 
 Qillqay Mach'ay

References 

Archaeological sites in Peru
Archaeological sites in Huánuco Region